Dobrovsky (masculine), Dobrovskaya (feminine), or Dobrovskoye (neuter) may refer to:
Dobrovsky District, a district of Lipetsk Oblast, Russia
Dobrovský (Dobrovská), Czech last name

See also
40440 Dobrovský, main belt asteroid
Dąbrowski (disambiguation)